Oscar Gatto (born 1 January 1985) is an Italian former professional racing cyclist, who rode professionally between 2007 and 2020, for seven different teams. His nickname is 'Oscar the Cat' because his surname (Gatto) is the Italian word for "cat", and his first name is Oscar.

Career
Born in Montebelluna, Gatto left  at the end of the 2013 season, and joined  for the 2014 season. In October 2015 it was announced that Gatto would join  for the 2016 season, with the team's directeur sportif Steven de Jongh describing his main role as providing support for Peter Sagan in the classics. He was named in the start list for the 2016 Tour de France.

Major results

2004
 4th Circuito del Porto
2005
 1st Giro del Canavese
 1st Stage 6 Giro della Valle d'Aosta
2006
 1st Coppa Città di Asti
 1st Stage 6 Giro delle Regioni
 5th Gran Premio della Liberazione
 7th Giro del Canavese
 10th Giro del Belvedere
2007
 2nd Overall Paris–Corrèze
2009
 1st Stage 1b (TTT) Settimana Internazionale di Coppi e Bartali
 2nd Overall Giro di Sardegna
1st Stage 3
 8th Gran Premio della Costa Etruschi
2010
 1st Gran Premio Nobili Rubinetterie
 1st Stage 1 (TTT) Brixia Tour
 3rd GP Kranj
 5th Trofeo Matteotti
 5th Gran Premio della Costa Etruschi
 7th Overall Tour of Turkey
2011
 1st Trofeo Matteotti
 1st Giro della Romagna
 1st Stage 8 Giro d'Italia
 1st Stage 2 Giro della Provincia di Reggio Calabria
 3rd Coppa Ugo Agostoni
 5th Classica Sarda
 5th Gran Premio Industria e Commercio di Prato
 7th Montepaschi Strade Bianche
2012
 1st Giro del Veneto
 1st Stage 3 Monviso-Venezia — Il Padania
 3rd Strade Bianche
 6th Memorial Marco Pantani
 6th Gran Premio Industria e Commercio di Prato
2013
 1st Dwars door Vlaanderen
 3rd GP Industria & Artigianato di Larciano
 8th Trofeo Laigueglia
2014
 Tour of Austria
1st Stages 2 & 4
 8th Dwars door Vlaanderen
2015
 Sibiu Cycling Tour
1st Stages 1 & 4
 6th Strade Bianche
 6th Gran Premio Nobili Rubinetterie
 6th Gran Premio della Costa Etruschi
 9th Gran Premio Bruno Beghelli
 9th Clásica de Almería
2016
 1st Stage 3 Vuelta a Andalucía
 3rd Overall Arctic Race of Norway
 7th Dwars door Vlaanderen
2017
 1st Prologue Tour of Austria
 5th Omloop Het Nieuwsblad
 9th Grand Prix of Aargau Canton
2020
 9th Grote Prijs Jean-Pierre Monseré

Grand Tour general classification results timeline

References

External links

1985 births
Living people
People from Montebelluna
Italian male cyclists
Italian Giro d'Italia stage winners
Cyclists from the Province of Treviso